Talk Talk Talk is the second studio album by the English rock band the Psychedelic Furs. It was released 15 May 1981 by Columbia Records. It was reissued with bonus tracks in 2002 by Columbia/Legacy and on vinyl in the UK in 2011 without bonus content.

Content
AllMusic noted that with Talk Talk Talk, "the Furs introduce[d] a brighter, poppier side to their underground rock edge".

Track listing
All songs written by Richard Butler, John Ashton, Roger Morris, Tim Butler, Duncan Kilburn and Vince Ely.

1981 UK track listing
Side 1
"Dumb Waiters" – 5:09
"Pretty in Pink" – 3:59
"I Wanna Sleep with You" – 3:17
"No Tears" – 3:14
"Mr. Jones" – 4:03
Side 2
"Into You Like a Train" – 4:35
"It Goes On" – 3:52
"So Run Down" – 2:51
"All of This and Nothing" – 6:25
"She Is Mine" – 3:51

1981 US track listing
Side 1
"Pretty in Pink" – 3:59
"Mr. Jones" – 4:03
"No Tears" – 3:14
"Dumb Waiters" – 5:09
"She Is Mine" – 3:51
Side 2
"Into You Like a Train" – 4:35
"It Goes On" – 3:52
"So Run Down" – 2:51
"I Wanna Sleep with You" – 3:17
"All of This and Nothing" – 6:25

2002 reissue
"Dumb Waiters" – 5:04
"Pretty in Pink" – 3:59
"I Wanna Sleep with You" – 3:17
"No Tears" – 3:14
"Mr. Jones" – 4:03
"Into You Like a Train" – 4:35
"It Goes On" – 3:52
"So Run Down" – 2:51
"All of This and Nothing" – 6:25
"She Is Mine" – 3:51
Bonus tracks

The demo of "All of This and Nothing" ends at 3:51 and is followed at 4:23 by "Buy Talk Talk Talk". Some copies of the UK 7" single of "Dumb Waiters" came in a "playable sleeve" – a stiff card picture bag with a clear flexi disc attached. This consisted of Richard Butler introducing extracts from "Into You Like a Train", "I Wanna Sleep With You" and "Pretty in Pink".

Personnel
The Psychedelic Furs
Richard Butler – vocals
Roger Morris – lead guitar
John Ashton – rhythm guitar
Tim Butler – bass
Duncan Kilburn – saxophone, keyboards
Vince Ely – drums
Technical
Steve Lillywhite - producer
Phil Thornalley, Will Gosling - engineers
Julian Balme, Richard Butler - design (after Andy Warhol)
Andrew Douglas - photography

Chart performance
Album

Singles

References

External links

*Talk Talk Talk (Adobe Flash) at Radio3Net (streamed copy where licensed)

The Psychedelic Furs albums
1981 albums
Albums produced by Steve Lillywhite
Columbia Records albums